In geometry, the dual snub 24-cell is a 144 vertex convex 4-polytope composed of 96 irregular cells. Each cell has faces of two kinds: 3 kites and 6 isosceles triangles. The polytope has a total of 432 faces (144 kites and 288 isosceles triangles) and 480 edges.

Geometry 
The dual snub 24-cell, first described by Koca et al. in 2011, is the dual polytope of the snub 24-cell, a semiregular polytope first described by Thorold Gosset in 1900.

Construction 
The vertices of a dual snub 24-cell are obtained using quaternion simple roots (T') in the generation of the 600 vertices of the 120-cell. The following describe  and  24-cells as quaternion orbit weights of D4 under the Weyl group W(D4):
O(0100) : T = {±1,±e1,±e2,±e3,(±1±e1±e2±e3)/2}
O(1000) : V1
O(0010) : V2
O(0001) : V3

 the snub 24-cell 
 the 600-cell  
 the 120-cell 
 the alternate snub 24-cell 

Projections

Dual 
The dual polytope of this polytope is the Snub 24-cell.

See also 
 Snub 24-cell honeycomb

Citations

References

 
 
 
 
 

4-polytopes